Social care in the United Kingdom is a devolved matter, so England, Northern Ireland, Scotland and Wales each have their own separate systems of private and publicly funded social care. Each country has differing policies, priorities and funding levels which has resulted in a variety of differences existing between the systems.

According to the Organisation for Economic Co-operation and Development the UK had one of the lowest government expenditures in Western Europe per head of the population at £695 in 2018 as compared with £1,530 in Norway, £1,451 in the Netherlands, £1,222 in Sweden or £1,033 in Switzerland, though higher than Spain or Portugal with £218 and £208 per head, respectively.

For details, see:
 Social care in England
 Social care in Scotland
 Health and Social Care in Northern Ireland
 Social care in Wales

UK-wide social care organisations
 British Association of Social Workers
 Carers UK
 Central Council for Education and Training in Social Work
 The Disabilities Trust
 Leonard Cheshire Disability
 Nuffield Trust
 Social Care Institute for Excellence
 Southern Cross Healthcare
 Sue Ryder Care
 Turning Point

See also
 Healthcare in the United Kingdom
 National Minimum Data Set for Social Care
 Approved mental health professional
 Approved social worker

References

 
Local government services in the United Kingdom